The 2019 Hamilton Tiger-Cats season was the 62nd season for the team in the Canadian Football League and their 70th overall. It was the 150th year overall in the combined history of the Tiger-Cats and its predecessors the Wildcats and Tigers; the team held sesquicentennial celebrations throughout the season.

The Tiger-Cats improved upon their 8–10 record from 2018 and finished the 2019 regular season with a franchise best 15–3 record. They finished in first place for the first time since 2014 and attempted unsuccessfully to win their 9th Grey Cup championship. This is the first season under co-general managers Drew Allemang and Shawn Burke, and the first full season under head coach Orlondo Steinauer. It was announced on December 3, 2018 that Steinauer would take the reins as the Tiger-Cats' head coach, replacing June Jones in that capacity. The plan was for Jones to remain with the team as an associate head coach and offensive coordinator, but he resigned with the club and joined the Houston Roughnecks of the XFL as head coach.

On October 19, 2019, the Tiger-Cats defeated the Ottawa Redblacks and recorded a franchise-record 13th win in a season. The team finished the season with 15 wins and with a perfect home record for the first time since the CFL went to an 18-game schedule, winning all nine home games. Despite their success during the regular season, they lost to the Winnipeg Blue Bombers, a team that had a dominant performance during the 107th Grey Cup game. With the Blue Bombers ending a 29-year Grey Cup drought, the Hamilton Tiger-Cats now hold the longest active Grey Cup drought dating back to the 1999 season, having won the 87th Grey Cup that season.

Offseason

Foreign drafts
For the first time in its history, the CFL held drafts for foreign players from Mexico and Europe. Like all other CFL teams, the Tiger-Cats held three non-tradeable selections in the 2019 CFL–LFA Draft, which took place on January 14, 2019. The 2019 European CFL Draft took place on April 11, 2019 where all teams held one non-tradeable pick.

CFL draft
The 2019 CFL Draft took place on May 2, 2019. The Tiger-Cats held eight selections in the eight-round draft, including three picks within the first 11 overall selections after trading Ryan Bomben and Jamal Robinson to the Montreal Alouettes.

Preseason

Schedule

Regular season

Season standings

Season schedule 
To accommodate for the viewership of the Toronto Raptors' 9pm EDT NBA Finals Game 6 start time on June 13, the CFL moved up the start time of the league opener that same day from 7:30pm to 7:00pm.

Post-season

Schedule

Team

Roster

Coaching staff

References

Hamilton Tiger-Cats seasons
2019 in Ontario
2019 Canadian Football League season by team